Sacco and Vanzetti is a 1960 play by  and Luciano Vincenzoni about the Sacco and Vanzetti case.

Development 

 and Luciano Vincenzoni wrote the chronicle play in 1960. Following its successful Italian production in Rome's Paroli Theater, the play traveled to Germany, France, Great Britain, and Latin America. A musical version of the play, The Shoemaker and the Peddler, played off-Broadway in New York.

Following its French translation by César Gattegno and Eli Marinelli, Raymond Gerbal staged the production with the Franc Théâtre in Paris's Théâtre Récamier in April 1964. Later productions moved to the suburbs.

References

Bibliography 

 Lo spettacolo, enciclopedia Garzanti, 1976, p. 647
 Teatro Nuovo, I, 3, 1961; p. 19 et seq., p. 40
 La Stampa, 1961-09-17
 Corriere della sera, 1961-06-29
 La Stampa, 1960-12-12

1960 plays
Italian plays
Works about Sacco and Vanzetti